Viyyat is a rural area located near Kariyavattom in the capital city of Kerala, India.

One of the famous temples located in Viyyat is Sree Viyyat Devi Kshethram. This temple is very famous for 'Mangalya pooja', 'Sarvabhista sidhi pooja', 'Saraswathi pooja', Ayillya pooja, 'Santhana saubhagya ganapathi homam' etc.

External links
 Viyyat on Facebook

Hindu temples in Thiruvananthapuram district